Pascal Abikanlou (1936? – 2009)
was a Beninese film maker, director and producer.

Career 
He directed the first feature movie Under the sign of Vaudoun in 1974.

Filmography 
 Under the sign of voodoo 1974
 Ganvié, my village 1967
 Stopover at Dahomey 1968
 First offerings 1969
 The Yam Festival 1969
 Operation Sonader 1971
 Water and shade 1971
 Africa at the rendezvous of the holy year 1975
 Sous le signe du vaudou 1976
 The Wind of Hope 1992
 Ouidah 92 1993
 Danhome Kingdom of Huegbadjavi 1989

References 

2009 deaths
Beninese film directors
1930s births